The Diocese of Nakuru may refer to;

Anglican Diocese of Nakuru, in the city of Nakuru, Kenya
Roman Catholic Diocese of Nakuru, in the city of Nakuru, Kenya